Charles Favart may refer to:

 Charles Simon Favart (1710–1792), French dramatist
 Charles Nicolas Favart (1749–1806), his son, French playwright